Test for Echo is the sixteenth studio album by the Canadian rock band Rush, released on 10 September 1996 on Anthem Records. It was the final Rush album co-produced by Peter Collins. The band supported the album with a world tour in 1996 and 1997, after which they went on a four-year hiatus following the deaths of drummer Neil Peart's daughter and wife, and would not record again until 2001.

The title track reached No. 1 on the mainstream rock chart. The song "Driven" became a bass showcase for Geddy Lee during live performances, while "Resist" was rearranged as an acoustic song on the Vapor Trails and R30 tours. The band did not perform any tracks from the album on subsequent tours. Test for Echo was remastered and reissued twice: in 2004 as a continuation of "The Rush Remasters" set and in 2013 as a part of the box set The Studio Albums 1989–2007. In 2015 it was reissued after being remastered by Sean Magee at Abbey Road Studios following a direct approach by Rush to remaster their entire back catalogue.

Background and pre-production
In May 1994, Rush finished their Counterparts Tour of the United States and Canada in support of the band's 15th album Counterparts (1993). The group then took a usual break in activity, but this went on to last 18 months as bass guitarist and vocalist Geddy Lee wanted to be at home for the first year of his daughter's life. With their free time, guitarist Alex Lifeson recorded his first solo album Victor and drummer/lyricist Neil Peart released a Buddy Rich tribute album Burning for Buddy and spent time on his technique, receiving formal instruction from the jazz drummer Freddie Gruber. For the majority of the album, Peart plays with a traditional grip.

In October 1995, the band decided to start work on the next Rush album and, as with their previous three albums, retreated to Chalet Studios in Claremont, Ontario, to write and rehearse. Having been together for more than 20 years at this point, Lifeson questioned if Test for Echo was to be Rush's last album and whether they were to tour it at all. He changed his mind when it was finished as the group was already in talks about the next album and said, "We've got a lot of stuff in us yet." The first sessions were difficult for him, having had full control of Victor and the "same old" discussions with Lee as to what direction the new Rush album would be prior to writing. "Once I exorcised those ghosts, the following week we wrote five songs. We dove into it and it was very, very positive from then on". The band put up inspirational slogans on the studio wall, including "Individually we are a ass, together we are a genius" and "If you want something done right, just forget it". Lee and Lifeson completed almost six songs before they presented any of their work to Peart as they did not want to interrupt the flow of their productive writing. They had reserved the studio for around ten weeks, but the productive sessions resulted in the writing finishing three weeks early. Lifeson said the group were in particularly good spirits throughout the album's production and put it down to the break they had taken.

The band adopted its usual method of Lee and Lifeson working on the music with Peart working alone on the lyrics, but the music was written in a different way than before. In the past, the writing had Lee and Lifeson form songs by matching pieces of music to verses and choruses as they went and all three would listen to what was put down and exchange ideas to develop them further. This time, lyrics were matched with suitable sections of music, after which they were recorded and Lee and Lifeson would work on something else. As Peart wrote: "They didn't want to get bogged down in the 'jigsaw puzzle' of assembling whole songs, but rather keep the momentum going with a flow of fresh ideas." After a collection of songs were worked out, the group started to refine their individual parts. In November 1995, the group were faced with heavy snow at Chalet Studios which led into the North American blizzard of 1996 in early January. The snow continued through the recording of the album, which inspired the album's artwork.

Almost all of the tracks were written, arranged and put onto a demo tape by December 1995, and the band was then joined by Peter Collins who they chose to resume his role as their co-producer. Collins was their co-producer on Power Windows (1985), Hold Your Fire (1987), and Counterparts and offered what Peart described as "small-but-critical improvements" to what they had already recorded. The album continued to display the group's change in sound, which had started on Presto (1989), towards guitar-oriented music and the reduction of keyboards.

Recording
The album was recorded from January to March 1996 at Bearsville Studios in Bearsville, New York. The studio was chosen because the band wanted to capture "more size" from Peart's drums and the facility was more suited to his kit. Additional recording took place at Reaction Studios in Toronto, where it snowed for 40 consecutive days. Test for Echo was the first time Rush worked with American engineers and mixers, having only worked with English or Australian personnel before. They chose the recording engineer Clif Norrell, a longtime fan of the band who once performed Rush cover songs in his own group.

The album was mixed in April 1996 by Andy Wallace at McClear Place in Toronto. The group made a conscious decision not to enter the studio until Wallace had prepared a mix for them to comment on. Lifeson said, "We'd hear completely different takes on these songs that we'd lived with for six or seven months. [...] There were things that we really wouldn't have thought of, and that was really the whole point of him being there". Upon release, Lifeson rated Test for Echo as one of Rush's best albums.

Songs
"Test for Echo" features lyrical contributions from Pye Dubois who had also written lyrics for three Rush songs prior. Lee said the words reflect the group's current situation at the time. Lifeson plays a Les Paul Custom guitar and described the song as "pure Rush".

"Driven" was written entirely on Lee's bass guitar and features three separate bass tracks. Lifeson said that Peart played "a little bit back on the beat" which gave the song a "heavier character" and caused Lee and himself to adjust their parts to fit his drums.

"Half the World" features Lifeson playing a 10-string mandola which he had played to get a feel for the instrument, but found it changed the song's personality completely. He presented it to Lee who expressed initial doubts as it displayed an unusual texture, but grew to like it.

"Time and Motion" originated from a set of lyrics that Peart had written, after which Lee and Lifeson worked on music for it which developed quickly. They wanted to dramatise the first lyrical phrase by incorporating major chords, but Lee said a first version of the track was put together some years prior, but never used.

Lee described "Dog Years" as "a bit punky".

"Limbo" is an instrumental track that was pieced together from different bits of ideas that the group had sketched out but remained unused.

Lifeson picked "Resist" as one of his favourite tracks, and among the best Rush had ever recorded.

Artwork
The cover displays an inuksuk, native to Canada. Created by the Inuit, an inuksuk is a stone figure in the shape of a human used to mark a food cache, hunting ground or a place where someone lost their life.

Release
The album was premiered in its entirety during a two-hour syndicated radio special on WKSC in Chicago, on 5 September 1996.

Reception

The AllMusic reviewer, Stephen Thomas Erlewine, gave Test for Echo three out of five stars, saying that Rush has "rarely played better in the past ten years than they have on Test for Echo".

Track listing

Personnel
Credits taken from the album's liner notes.

Rush
Geddy Lee – bass guitar, vocals, synthesizers
Alex Lifeson – electric and acoustic guitars, mandola
Neil Peart – drums, cymbals, hammer dulcimer

Production
Rush – production, arrangement
Peter Collins – production, arrangement
Clif Norrell – recording
Andy Wallace – mixing
Simon Pressey – project assistant engineer
Chris Laidlaw and Paul Marconi – recording assistants at Bearsville Studios
Tom Heron – recording assistant at Reaction Studios
Bob Ludwig – mastering
Hugh Syme – art direction, design, digital illustration
Andrew MacNaughtan, Anthony Frederick, Dimo Safari, Eugene Fisher and Richard C. Negus – photography

Charts

Certifications

References
Notes:

External links
 

Rush (band) albums
1996 albums
Progressive rock albums by Canadian artists
Atlantic Records albums
Anthem Records albums
Albums produced by Peter Collins (record producer)